Bream Head is a promontory on the east coast of Northland in the North Island of New Zealand. Located at the end of a 30 kilometre-long peninsula, the head juts into the Pacific Ocean to the southeast of Whangārei. The Te Whara Track in the Bream Head Scenic Reserve is at least 700 years old. The Hen and Chicken Islands are located off the headland at a distance of 12 kilometres. It forms the northern extremity of Bream Bay, and guards the entrance to Whangārei Harbour, a natural inlet extending to the northwest. The Marsden Point Oil Refinery is located on the opposing shore of the harbour five kilometres to the west.

To Bream Head's immediate north is a long sandy beach called Ocean Beach.

Biology
It contains a scenic reserve, the Bream Head Scenic Reserve, which unlike Bream Head is an official name. This has a long history of Māori occupation, being now wāhi tapu, and is one of the most important coastal broadleaf forest reserves in Northland with its population of native flax snail – pūpūharakeke and Whirinaki skinks.

Geology

Gallery

References

Whangarei District
Headlands of the Northland Region
Volcanic plugs of New Zealand
Volcanoes of the Northland Region